Leon Wegner (31 March 1824, Poznań – 9 July 1873, Poznań) was a Polish economist and historian, co-founder of Poznań Society of Friends of Arts and Sciences.

References

 Witold Jakóbczyk, Przetrwać na Wartą 1815-1914, Dzieje narodu i państwa polskiego, vol. III-55, Krajowa Agencja Wydawnicza, Warszawa 1989.

1824 births
1873 deaths
Writers from Poznań
People from the Grand Duchy of Posen
Polish economists
19th-century Polish historians
Polish male non-fiction writers
Polish social activists of the Prussian partition